The Harry S Truman Birthplace State Historic Site is a state-owned property in Lamar, Barton County, Missouri, maintained by the Missouri Department of Natural Resources, preserving the -story childhood home of Harry S. Truman, the 33rd President of the United States. The future president was born here on May 8, 1884, in the downstairs southwest bedroom. The home was purchased by the state in 1957 and dedicated as a historic site in 1959 at a ceremony attended by Truman himself. The site was added to the National Register of Historic Places in 1969.

References

External links

Harry S Truman Birthplace State Historic Site Missouri Department of Natural Resources

Missouri State Historic Sites
Historic house museums in Missouri
Presidential homes in the United States
Protected areas established in 1957
Presidential museums in Missouri
Museums in Barton County, Missouri
Harry S. Truman
Truman family residences
Birthplaces of individual people
Houses on the National Register of Historic Places in Missouri
Houses completed in 1881
Buildings and structures in Barton County, Missouri
National Register of Historic Places in Barton County, Missouri
1881 establishments in Missouri
Monuments and memorials to Harry S. Truman